The 1939 All-Ireland Senior Football Championship Final was the 52nd All-Ireland Final and the deciding match of the 1939 All-Ireland Senior Football Championship, an inter-county Gaelic football tournament for the top teams in Ireland. 

Kerry had to play without their captain Sean Brosnan who had a heavy cold.  Dan Spring (later TD, and father of Tánaiste Dick Spring) scored both Kerry goals. Meath rued their missed chances - they shot 11 wides.

It was the fifth of five All-Ireland football titles won by Kerry in the 1930s.

This was the first Championship meeting of Kerry and Meath.

To avoid a colour clash, Kerry wore the red and white of Dingle, the county champions at the time.

References

All-Ireland Senior Football Championship Final
All-Ireland Senior Football Championship Final, 1939
All-Ireland Senior Football Championship Finals
Kerry county football team matches
Meath county football team matches